The 1906–07 Challenge Cup was the 11th staging of rugby league's oldest knockout competition, the Challenge Cup.

The final was contested by Warrington and Oldham at Wheater's Field in Broughton, Salford.

The final was played on Saturday 27 April 1907, where Warrington beat Oldham 17–3 at Wheater's Field in front of a crowd of 18,500.

Warrington's win was their second in three seasons.

Qualifier

First round

Second round

Quarterfinals

Semifinals

Final

References

External links
Challenge Cup official website 
Challenge Cup 1906/07 results at Rugby League Project

Challenge Cup
Challenge Cup